The following is a timeline of the history of the city of Algiers, Algeria.

Prior to 16th century

 3rd century BC – Yksm settled by Punics.
 146 BC – Icosium became part of the Roman Empire.
 371 AD – City raided by Firmus.
 5th century AD – Vandals in power.
 7th century AD – Arabs in power.
 960 – Algiers founded by Bologhine ibn Ziri.
 1014 – Hammadids in power.
 1018 – Djamaa el Kebir mosque built.
 1159 – Almohades in power.
 1313 – Ziyanids of the Kingdom of Tlemcen in power.

16th–18th centuries

 1516
 Capture of Algiers by Hayreddin Barbarossa and Aruj.
 Kasbah construction begins.
 1518 – Harbour construction begins.
 1529 – Capture of Algiers by Hayreddin Barbarossa.
 1544 – Lighthouse built.
 1545 – Fort de l'Empereur built.
 1549 – Muslim hospital founded.
 1556 – Citadel built.
 1581 – Fort Bab Azoun built.
 1612
 Ketchaoua Mosque built.
 Hospital of the Holy Trinity founded.
 1622 – Aqueducts and Jama Bitchnin (mosque) built.
 1660 – Mosque of the Fishery built.
 1661 – Tamentfoust Castle built.
 1696 – Mosque of Sidi Abderrahman built.
 1770 – Dano-Norwegian Bombardment of Algiers
 1775 – 8 July: Attempted invasion of Algiers by Spanish forces.
 1783 – 4–8 August: Bombardment of Algiers by Spanish forces.
 1784 – 12 July: Bombardment of Algiers by Spanish-Neapolitan-Maltese-Portuguese forces.
 1791 – Ketshawa Mosque built.
 1799 – Palais d'Hiver du Gouverneur built.

19th century

 1805 – The day after the assassination of the head of the influential family, Busnach (29 June 1805), the Janissaries sacked Algiers killing between 200 and 500 Jews. Causing serious unrest throughout the city.
 1816 – 27 August: Bombardment of Algiers by Anglo-Dutch forces.
 1817 – Kesba Berranee mosque built.
 1824 – Bombardment of Algiers by British forces.
 1825 – Fort des Anglais built.
 1830 – June–July: Invasion of Algiers by French forces; city becomes capital of French Algeria.
 1832 – Jardin d'essai laid out.
 1835 – National Library of Algeria founded.
 1836 – Northern harbour construction begins.
 1847 – Jardin Marengo laid out.
 1866 – Boulevard de la Republique constructed.
 1870 – Holy Trinity church built.
 1872 – Notre Dame d'Afrique church built.
 1878 – Church of St. Augustin built.
 1888 – Population: 56,000.
 1890 – Algiers Observatory built in Bouzaréah.
 1897 – National Museum of Algerian Antiquities relocates to Mustapha Superieur.

20th century

 1904
 Medersa opens.
 Southern harbour construction begins.
 1906 – Population: 138,240.
 1908
 National Museum of Fine Arts of Algiers established.
 Quai de la Marine extended.
 Cinema opens.
 1909 – University of Algiers founded.
 1910 – Grand Post Office built.
 1912 – Population: 172,397.
 1921 – Mouloudia Chaàbia d'Alger football club formed.
 1924 – Maison Blanche Airport begins operating.
 1928 – Bardo National Museum of Prehistory and Ethnography established.
 1930 – Population: 246,061.
 1933 – Palais du Gouvernement built.
 1935 – Stade communal de Saint Eugène (sport stadium) built.
 1942
 November: Conflict between Axis and Allied forces.
 Camus' novel L’Étranger published.
 1948 – Population: 266,165 city; 488,893 urban agglomeration.

1950s–1980s

 1950 – Population: 516,000 (urban agglomeration).
 1952 – Aerohabitat housing complex built.
 1953 – Jacques Chevallier becomes mayor.
 1954
 Anti-French unrest.
 Diar el Mahçoul housing development and 200 Colonnes housing complex built.
 1956
 30 September: Battle of Algiers begins.
 National Liberation Front headquartered in city.
 1958 – May: Pro-French unrest.
 1959 – Siemens branch in business.
 1960
 January: Pro-French unrest.
 Population: 872,000 (urban agglomeration).
 1961 – April: Coup attempt.
 1962
 City becomes capital of independent Algeria.
 200,000 European residents depart.
 1963
 Centre National d'Etudes et d'Analyses pour la Population et le Développement headquartered in city.
 Algerian National Theatre established.
 1966
 Pontecorvo's film The Battle of Algiers released.
 Population: 903,530 city; 943,142 urban agglomeration; 1,648,038 metro.
 1969 – Pan-African Arts Festival held.
 1972 – 5 July 1962 Stadium opens.
 1973 – September: International summit of the Non-Aligned Movement held in city.
 1975 – Hotel El-Aurassi in business.
 1977 – Population: 1,523,000 city; 1,740,461 urban agglomeration.
 1978 – July: All-Africa Games held.
 1982 – Martyrs Memorial erected.
 1985 – National Institute for Global Strategic Studies headquartered in city.
 1988 – October: Anti-government demonstrations.

1990s

 1990
 March: African Cup of Nations held.
 Population: 1,819,000 (urban agglomeration).
 1991 – Political unrest.
 1992
 August: Algiers airport bombing.
 Casbah of Algiers designated an UNESCO World Heritage Site.
 1994
 24 December: Air France Flight 8969 hijacked at Algiers Airport.
 National Library of Algeria building inaugurated.
 1997 – Algiers Stock Exchange established.
 1998 – Population: 2,988,145.
 2000
  newspaper begins publication.
 Population: 2,278,000 (urban agglomeration).

21st century

 2001
 Flood.
 Algeria Cinema opens.
 2003 – 21 May: The 6.8  Boumerdès earthquake affected northern Algeria with a maximum Mercalli intensity of X (Extreme). With at least 400 killed in Algiers alone, more than 2,200 people were killed altogether, and a moderate tsunami sank boats located near Spain's Balearic Islands. 
 2004 – September–October: 2004 Pan Arab Games held.
 2007
 Museum of Modern Art of Algiers inaugurated.
 April: Bombings.
 July: All-Africa Games held.
 11 December: Bombings.
 2008
 Centre Commercial Al Qods shopping mall opens.
 Population: 2,712,944.
 2009 – Centre Commercial Bab Ezzouar built.
 2010 – Protests.
 2011
 Protests.
 Algiers Metro and Algiers tramway begin operating.
 Population: 2,916,000 (urban agglomeration).
 2018 – African Youth Games to be held in Algiers.

See also
 Algiers history
 List of Pashas and Deys of Algiers (Regency of Algiers)
 List of mayors of Algiers, 1830–present (includes French period)
 History of Algeria
 Years in Algeria
 
 Timelines of other cities in Algeria: Oran

References

Bibliography

in English
Published in 18th–19th centuries
 
 
 
 
 
 
 
 
 
 
 
 
 
 

Published in 20th century
 
 
 
 
 
 
 
 
 
  

Published in 21st century

in French
  (+ table of contents)

External links

   (Bibliography of open access  articles)
  (Images, etc.)
  (Images, etc.)
  (Images, etc.)
  (Bibliography)
  (Bibliography)
  (Bibliography)
 

 
Algiers
Years in Algeria
Algiers
Algiers